Frauke Schmitt Gran (born 12 March 1969) is a German orienteering competitor and the first orienteer from Germany to obtain a medal in the world championships.

She received a bronze medal in the short course at the 1999 World Orienteering Championships in Inverness, behind Yvette Baker and Lucie Böhm.

References

External links
 
 Frauke Schmitt-Gran at World of O Runners

1969 births
Living people
German orienteers
Female orienteers
Foot orienteers
World Orienteering Championships medalists